"Back Up"  is a song by American West Coast hip hop recording artist Snoop Dogg. It was released for digital download and streaming on November 18, 2015. The song is the first single released from the Mixtape Beach City (2015). The song produced by Scoop DeVille and mixing by Todd Cooper. The artwork was created by John Fenerides.

Commercial performance
"Back Up" entered the Canadian Songs Chart dated November 22, 2015 at number 89. The song has peaked at number 80 on the chart.

Track listing 
Download digital
Back Up (Explicit) — 4:30

Music streaming
Back Up — 4:30

Music video
On December 16, 2015 Snoop uploaded the lyric video for "Back Up" on his YouTube account.

Charts

Weekly charts

References

2015 songs
Snoop Dogg songs
Songs written by Snoop Dogg
Song recordings produced by Scoop DeVille
Songs written by Scoop DeVille
Gangsta rap songs
G-funk songs